The Conversations with Filmmakers Series is part of the University Press of Mississippi which is sponsored by Mississippi's eight state universities.  The mission of the Series is to publish collected interviews with world-famous directors.  The current Filmmakers Series editor is Gerald Peary, a noted film critic and Professor of Communications and Journalism at Suffolk University, Boston. Peary was appointed to this position following the death of the Series’ original general editor, Dr. Peter Brunette.

Background
The series was launched in 1998 with Gerald Peary's Quentin Tarantino: Interviews. It was favorably reviewed by MovieMaker magazine which found a balance and depth throughout saying, "Contemporary giants like Soderbergh, Oliver Stone and John Sayles are treated with just as much esteem as legends like Wilder and John Huston."

Interviewees 

 J.J. Abrams
 Robert Aldrich
 Woody Allen
 Pedro Almodóvar
 Robert Altman
 Theo Angelopoulos
 Michelangelo Antonioni
 Hal Ashby
 Ingmar Bergman
 Bernardo Bertolucci
 Kathryn Bigelow
 Danny Boyle
 Stan Brakhage
 Charles Burnett
 Tim Burton
 James Cameron
 Jane Campion
 Frank Capra
 John Cassavetes
 Claude Chabrol
 Charlie Chaplin
 The Coen Brothers
 Francis Ford Coppola
 Sofia Coppola
 Roger Corman
 Wes Craven
 David Cronenberg
 George Cukor
 Jonathan Demme
 Clint Eastwood
 Blake Edwards
 Atom Egoyan
 Asghar Farhadi
 Federico Fellini
 David Fincher
 John Ford
 William Friedkin
 Su Friedrich
 Samuel Fuller
 Terry Gilliam
 Jean-Luc Godard
 Stuart Gordon
 Peter Greenaway

 D.W. Griffith
 Michael Haneke
 Howard Hawks
 Todd Haynes
 Werner Herzog
 Alfred Hitchcock
 Dennis Hopper
 John Huston
 Jim Jarmusch
 Neil Jordan
 Wong Kar-wai
 Elia Kazan
 Buster Keaton
 Krzysztof Kieślowski
 Barbara Kopple
 Harmony Korine
 Stanley Kubrick
 Akira Kurosawa
 Fritz Lang
 David Lean
 Ang Lee
 Spike Lee
 Mike Leigh
 Kasi Lemmons
 George Lucas
 Baz Luhrmann
 Sidney Lumet
 David Lynch
 Guy Maddin
 Louis Malle
 Joseph L. Mankiewicz
 Albert and David Maysles
 Jonas Mekas
 Merchant-Ivory
 Anthony Minghella
 Errol Morris
 Nichols and May
 Brian De Palma
 Jafar Panahi
 Alexander Payne
 Sam Peckinpah
 Arthur Penn
 Roman Polanski
 Abraham Polonsky
 Michael Powell
 Otto Preminger
 Satyajit Ray

 Jean Renoir
 Alain Resnais
 Martin Ritt
 Robert Rodriguez
 Eric Rohmer
 George A. Romero
 David O. Russell
 Carlos Saura
 John Sayles
 Fred Schepisi
 Martin Scorsese
 Ridley Scott
 Ousmane Sembène
 John Singleton
 Steven Soderbergh
 Steven Spielberg
 George Stevens
 Oliver Stone
 Quentin Tarantino
 Andrei Tarkovsky
 François Truffaut
 Liv Ullmann
 Agnes Varda
 Paul Verhoeven
 Lars von Trier
 Margarethe von Trotta
 John Waters
 Lois Weber
 Peter Weir
 Orson Welles
 Billy Wilder
 Michael Winterbottom
 John Woo
 William Wyler
 Zhang Yimou
 Fred Zinnemann

References

External links
 University Press of Mississippi
 

Mississippi State University
Mississippi, University Press of
Publications established in 1998